The Chiesa della Madonnalta is a Renaissance-style, Roman Catholic church located on Viale Savona (an old Roman road) about three miles from the center of Acqui Terme, Province of Alessandria, region of Piedmont, Italy.

History 
The church was first documented from a reconstruction in the 17th century. The church is notable for a portico of tuscan columns. In the lateral altars are a Virgin and Child with Saints Guido and Antony of Padua and a Madonna and Child with young St John the Baptist and St Joseph, from the 17th century. To the left of the entrance is a 16th-century relief of Madonna and child.

References 

Roman Catholic churches in Acqui Terme
17th-century Roman Catholic church buildings in Italy
Renaissance architecture in Piedmont